Ranunculus asiaticus, the Persian buttercup, is a species of buttercup (Ranunculus) native to the eastern Mediterranean region in southwestern Asia, southeastern Europe (Crete, Karpathos and Rhodes), and northeastern Africa.

It is a herbaceous perennial plant growing to 45 cm tall, with simple or branched stems. The basal leaves are three-lobed, with leaves higher on the stems more deeply divided; like the stems, they are downy or hairy. The flowers are 3–5 cm diameter, variably red to pink, yellow, or white, with one to several flowers on each stem.

It is a protected species in some jurisdictions, including Israel.

Cultivation and uses
Double-flowered forms, which are likely hybrids, are a popular ornamental plant in gardens, and widely used in floristry. Numerous cultivars have been selected, including 'Bloomingdale', 'Picotee', 'Pot Dwarf', and 'Superbissima'. The plants can tolerate light frost, but are not hardy at temperatures below -10 °C.

'Tecolote' and 'Bloomingdale' are examples of the double-flowered plants (not shown here). The single-flowered species form is not commercially cultivated on any significant scale. By contrast, the similar-looking Anemone coronaria is widely available in single-flower 'De Caen' hybrid forms. However, as with Ranunculus asiaticus, the species form, which also has red single flowers, is not commercially cultivated.

References

External links
 

asiaticus
Plants described in 1753
Flora of Africa
Flora of Asia
Flora of Europe
Taxa named by Carl Linnaeus